Hoàng Văn Phúc (born 1964) is a Vietnamese former footballer who is currently the interim manager of V.League 1 side Hà Nội.

Managerial career
In 2013, Phúc was named the interim manager of the Vietnam national football team.

Achievements

Club
Quảng Nam
V.League 1: 2017

International

Vietnam U16
AFF U-16 Youth Championship:
 Winners : 2010

References

Living people
Vietnamese footballers
Vietnam international footballers
1964 births
Vietnam national football team managers
Vietnamese football managers
Association footballers not categorized by position
Sportspeople from Hanoi
21st-century Vietnamese people